Daniel Kennedy (1925 – 6 February 1976) was an Irish sportsman. He is best known as a hurler for several teams Thomastown, Dicksboro and Bennettsbridge clubs and was a member of the Kilkenny senior inter-county team in the 1940s and 1950s. Dan Kennedy captained Kilkenny in 1947.

Playing career

Club

Kennedy first played hurling with his local Thomastown club and enjoyed some success.  In 1946 it was with Thomastown that he won his first county title.  Kennedy later joined the Dicksboro club and won a second county medal in 1950, however, it was with the famous Bennettsbridge club that he became really successful.  He added more county medals to his collection in 1952, 1953, 1955 and 1956.

Inter-county

Kennedy first came to prominence on the inter-county scene as a member of the Kilkenny senior hurling team in the mid-1940s.  He made his debut in 1945 at the age of nineteen and quickly captured his first Leinster title.  Kilkenny subsequently qualified for the All-Ireland final with Tipperary providing the opposition.  A huge crowd of 70,000 saw Kilkenny claw their way back in the second-half, however, victory went to Tipp on a score line of 5–6 to 3–6.  In 1946 Kennedy won a second Leinster medal before later lining out in his second All-Ireland final.  Arch-rivals Cork were the opposition on the day, however, after scoring five goals in the second-half it was the Munstermen who took the title leaving Kennedy on the losing side once again.

In the 1947 All-Ireland Senior Hurling Championship Kennedy was appointed captain of the team for the year.  He quickly added a third consecutive Leinster title to his collection before later leading his men out in a third consecutive championship decider.   In the 1947 All-Ireland Senior Hurling Championship Final, which has  been described as the greatest hurling final of all-time, Kilkenny sealed the victory on a score line of 2–7 to 0–14 against Cork, giving Kennedy an All-Ireland medal.  It would be 1950 before he won his fourth Leinster title and, once again, Kilkenny later qualified for the All-Ireland final.  Tipperary were the opponents once again and ended up as the victors on a score line of 1–9 to 1–8.  In spite of the close score line the game was an uninteresting affair.  Kennedy retired from inter-county hurling in the mid-1950s.

Province

Kennedy also lined out with Leinster in the inter-provincial hurling competition, however, he never won a Railway Cup medal.

References 

 

1925 births
1976 deaths
Thomastown hurlers
Dicksboro hurlers
Bennettsbridge hurlers
Kilkenny inter-county hurlers
Leinster inter-provincial hurlers
All-Ireland Senior Hurling Championship winners